Metapseudidae is a family of crustaceans belonging to the order Tanaidacea.

Genera

Genera:
 Apseudomorpha Miller, 1940
 Apseudomorpha Sieg, 1980
 Bamberus Stępień & Błażewicz-Paszkowycz, 2013

References

Tanaidacea